Stony Clove may refer to:

In New York:
Stony Clove Creek, a tributary of Esopus Creek
Stony Clove Notch, a narrow pass in the Town of Hunter in Greene County
Stony Clove Notch Railroad Station, a flag stop on the former Ulster and Delaware Railroad closed in 1932 when that railroad was acquired by New York Central